Cù Lao Dung is a rural district (huyện) of Sóc Trăng province in the Mekong River Delta region of Vietnam. As of 2003 the district had a population of 62,025. The district covers an area of 235 km². The district capital lies at Cù Lao Dung.

References

Districts of Sóc Trăng province